Pseudochama is a species of bivalve mollusc in the family Chamidae.

Fossil records
The genus is known from the Eocene to the Recent periods (age range: from 40.4 to 0.0 million years ago). Fossils shells have been found all over the world.

Species
Species within this genus include:
Pseudochama cristella  (Lamarck, 1819) 
Pseudochama exogyra (Conrad, 1837) – Pacific jewelbox
Pseudochama granti Strong, 1934 – deep jewelbox
Pseudochama gryphina  (Lamarck, 1819) 
Pseudochama inezae Bayer, 1943 – alabaster jewelbox
Pseudochama radians (Lamarck, 1819) – Atlantic jewelbox (accepted as Pseudochama cristella Lamarck, 1819)

Synonyms:

 Chama cornuta Dillwyn, 1817 and Chama gryphina Lamarck, 1819 have been accepted as Pseudochama gryphina.

References

Chamidae
Bivalve genera